The Segugio dell'Appennino or Piccolo Lepraiolo Italiano is a breed of small Italian scenthound, bred specifically to hunt hare. It may be either smooth-haired or wire-haired. It received full recognition from the Ente Nazionale della Cinofilia Italiana in 2010. It is one of four Italian breeds of scenthound, the others being the Segugio Italiano a Pelo Forte, the Segugio Italiano a Pelo Raso and the Segugio Maremmano.

History 

The Segugio dell'Appennino was described as a breed or type distinct from other Italian dogs of segugio type in 1882, in an article in the magazine La Caccia Illustrata. A breed standard was drawn up by the Ente Nazionale della Cinofilia Italiana in 2005, and the breed received full recognition in 2010. From 2010 to 2018 the number of annual registrations varied from 173 to 414.

In 2015 an analysis of microsatellite data found no significant genetic distance between the Segugio dell'Appennino and the Segugio Maremmano.

See also
 Dogs portal
 List of dog breeds

References 

Hounds
Dog breeds originating in Italy
Hunting dogs